Sacadin is the largest of the six Somaliland islands of the Zeila Archipelago, off the coast of Somaliland. It has an area of 7.2 square kilometers (about 720 hectares) and is mostly desert, although 2 portions of the island have abundant vegetation. It is 11.5 kilometers long and is located 5.4 kilometers north of the coast of Somaliland, near the border with Djibouti.

Its surface area is comparatively larger than that of Gibraltar and 3 times that of Monaco.

See also
Administrative divisions of Somaliland
Regions of Somaliland
Districts of Somaliland

Aibat

References

Islands of Somaliland
Islands of Somalia